Vanacampus vercoi, also known as Verco's pipefish is a species of marine fish belonging to the family Syngnathidae. They can be found inhabiting seaweed and seagrass beds in addition to tidepools at depths between 2–4 meters from Spencer's Gulf to Encounter Bay, South Australia. Their diet likely consists of small crustaceans such as amphipods and copepods. Reproduction occurs through ovoviviparity in which the males brood eggs before giving live birth.

References

External links 

 Vanacampus vercoi at FishBase
 Vanacampus vercoi at Fishes of Australia

Syngnathidae
Fish described in 1921
Taxa named by Edgar Ravenswood Waite